In electrochemistry, a salt bridge or ion bridge is a laboratory device used to connect the oxidation and reduction half-cells of a galvanic cell (voltaic cell), a type of electrochemical cell. It maintains electrical neutrality within the internal circuit. If no salt bridge were present, the solution in one-half cell would accumulate a negative charge and the solution in the other half cell would accumulate a positive charge as the reaction proceeded, quickly preventing further reaction, and hence the production of electricity. Salt bridges usually come in two types: glass tubes and filter paper.

Glass tube bridges 
One type of salt bridge consists of a U-shaped glass tube filled with a relatively inert electrolyte. It is usually a combination of potassium or ammonium cations and chloride or nitrate anions, which have similar mobility in solution. The combination is chosen which does not react with any of the chemicals used in the cell. The electrolyte is often gelified with agar-agar to help prevent the intermixing of fluids that might otherwise occur.

The conductivity of a glass tube bridge depends mostly on the concentration of the electrolyte solution. At concentrations below saturation, an increase in concentration increases conductivity. Beyond-saturation electrolyte content and narrow tube diameter may both lower conductivity.

Filter paper bridges  
Porous paper such as filter paper may be used as a salt bridge if soaked in an appropriate electrolyte such as the electrolytes used in glass tube bridges. No gelification agent is required as the filter paper provides a solid medium for conduction.

The conductivity of this kind of salt bridge depends on a number of factors: the concentration of the electrolyte solution, the texture of the paper, and the absorbing ability of the paper. Generally, smoother texture and higher absorbency equate to higher conductivity.

A porous disk or other porous barriers between the two half-cells may be used instead of a salt bridge; these allow ions to pass between the two solutions while preventing bulk mixing of the solutions.

See also 
 Liquid junction potential
 Ion transport number

References 

Electrochemical concepts
Laboratory equipment